Damjan Prelovšek (born 18 February 1945 in Ljubljana) is a Slovenian art historian, an expert on the architect Jože Plečnik. He was the Slovenian ambassador in Prague. From the mid-1960s to the early 1970s, he competed as Yugoslav slalom canoeist. He finished 17th in the C-1 event at the 1972 Summer Olympics in Munich.

References

External links 
 Damjan PRESLOVSEK at CanoeSlalom.net

1945 births
Canoeists at the 1972 Summer Olympics
Living people
Olympic canoeists of Yugoslavia
Yugoslav male canoeists
Slovenian male canoeists
Slovenian art historians
Slovenian diplomats
Members of the European Academy of Sciences and Arts
Ambassadors of Slovenia to the Czech Republic